Mark William Hemphill was the editor of Trains magazine from September, 2000, until July, 2004. Prior to joining Trains he served as assistant editor of HyRail Production's CTC Board magazine.

Mr. Hemphill attended the University of Illinois at Urbana-Champaign and the University of Colorado at Denver, earning degrees in history from each.

Hemphill was the first Trains editor to have worked in the railroad industry, having started Mountain Diesel Transportation in Denver with Dale Sanders, also of CTC Board. He later joined the Kansas City Southern Railway in Shreveport, Louisiana, as a train dispatcher.

From 2005 until 2007, Hemphill was the Senior Consultant, Rail, for the Iraq Reconstruction Management Office, an arm of the US Department of State. In this capacity he assisted the Director General of the Iraqi Republic Railways in the reconstruction of Iraq’s national railroad system.

As of 2011, Mr. Hemphill was a director of railroad consulting services for HDR Engineering, Inc. In 2019 Hemphill left HDR to work for Rio Grande Pacific Corporation heading the Uinta Basin Rail construction project. 

He is the author of one book, Union Pacific: Salt Lake Route. (Erin [Ont.]: Boston Mills Press, 1995.)

References

Hemphill, Mark W
Hemphill, Mark W
American magazine editors
University of Illinois alumni
American people in rail transportation
Rail transport photographers
University of Colorado Denver alumni